Palm Key is an island located in Florida Bay near latitude 25°7'N, and longitude 80°53'W, or about  southeast of the town of Flamingo, Florida. While it is now apparently uninhabited it was once inhabited by fishermen. In fiction it is the home and base of operations for Dr. Benton Quest of the TV series Jonny Quest. It is also mentioned in Robert Louis Stevenson's Treasure Island.

Beaches of Monroe County, Florida
Islands of Monroe County, Florida
Beaches of Florida
Islands of Florida